Armin Wolf (born 19 August 1966) is an Austrian journalist and television anchor. In 2017 Politico Europe called him "one of Europe’s most skilled (and feared) political journalists". He was named "European Journalist of the Year 2019" at the Prix Europa media contest.

Early life and education
Born in Innsbruck, Tyrol, Wolf graduated from the University of Vienna with a master's degree and from the University of Innsbruck with a doctorate in political science. In 2010 he earned an MBA degree at the Berlin School of Creative Leadership at Steinbeis University in Berlin.

Career
Wolf began his broadcasting career in 1985 as a freelance reporter for ORF, Austria's public broadcasting company. In 1987 he moved to Vienna as a reporter and editor for foreign affairs at ORF's premier radio station Ö1. In 1991/92 he was based in Washington D.C. as U.S. correspondent. From 1995 to 2002 he was political editor, chief correspondent and managing editor of various TV news programs at ORF.

Since 2002, Wolf has been presenting ORF's news show ZIB 2, presently alternating with Marielouise Lorenz-Dittlbacher. ZIB 2 is being broadcast Mondays through Fridays and has a market share of up to approximately 30 percent. In 2018, he interviewed Russian president Vladimir Putin.

In addition, Wolf has published three books on political communication and taught courses in political science at the universities of Vienna and Innsbruck.

Recognition
For his interviews Wolf has been distinguished with several awards, e.g. Austria's "Journalist of the Year" 2004 and 2018 and four Romy awards as Austria's most popular TV anchor in 2006, 2007, 2012, and 2019. For Austria's most popular Twitter account he was elected "Onliner of the Year" in the Media category by visitors to the web site werbeplanung.at and by visitors to werbeplanung.at's Facebook page in 2011. He was elected "Communicator of the Year" 2012 by visitors to the web site of the Public Relations Association Austria. Prestigious German awards include the following:

2019 –  (Leipzig) 
2018 – Grimme-Preis (Special Award)
2016 – Hanns-Joachim-Friedrichs-Preis

Personal life
Wolf lives with his wife, Austrian journalist Euke Frank (editor-in-chief of the magazine Woman), and her two children in Vienna. From 2001 to 2004 he was married to ORF presenter Birgit Fenderl.

Wolf's great-grandfather was mountaineer and canon lawyer .

References

This article is based in part on material from the German Wikipedia

External links 
 
 Armin Wolf on about.me
 Wolf's blog (in German)
 Biography on Wolf's Blog (in English)
 Biography on the ORF website (in German)
  (in German)
  (in German)

Austrian journalists
Austrian television presenters
1966 births
Living people
ORF (broadcaster) people
Mass media people from Innsbruck
University of Innsbruck alumni
University of Vienna alumni